Erbessa citrina is a moth of the family Notodontidae first described by Herbert Druce in 1898. It is found in Peru, Venezuela, French Guiana and Brazil.

References

Moths described in 1898
Notodontidae of South America